José Vicente (3 February 1922 – 5 July 2022) was a Puerto Rican pole vaulter who won gold at the 1946 Central American and Caribbean Games, and competed in the 1948 Summer Olympics and in the 1952 Summer Olympics. He was born in San Juan, Puerto Rico.

In 1988 he was inducted into the Agricultural Research Service's hall of fame.

References

1922 births
2022 deaths
Puerto Rican centenarians
Puerto Rican male pole vaulters
Sportspeople from San Juan, Puerto Rico
Olympic track and field athletes of Puerto Rico
Athletes (track and field) at the 1948 Summer Olympics
Athletes (track and field) at the 1952 Summer Olympics
Central American and Caribbean Games medalists in athletics
Central American and Caribbean Games gold medalists for Puerto Rico
Competitors at the 1946 Central American and Caribbean Games
Competitors at the 1950 Central American and Caribbean Games